Jazz Casual - The Thad Jones / Mel Lewis Jazz Orchestra, Woody Herman and his Swinging Herd consists of a recording of a Woody Herman and his Swinging Herd appearance from 1963 and a Thad Jones / Mel Lewis Jazz Orchestra appearance from 1968 that were combined and released as a single DVD video and also as an audio CD.  Jazz Casual was a KQED-produced television show of studio performances by major jazz musicians.  The same material has also been released in different packages (e.g. a DVD of the Jones/Lewis Orchestra tracks combined with the 1961 appearance of the Dave Brubeck Quartet and the 1962 Modern Jazz Quartet appearance and another DVD including all 3 Woody Herman appearances from 1963 and 1964 which were both also part of an 8 DVD complete set of all 28 Jazz Casual TV episodes.)

Track listing
 "Just Blues" – 4:41
 Thad Jones, Introductions – 0:36
 "St.Louis Blues" – 12:18
 Interview With Thad, Mel, Section Leader – 4:07
 "Kids Are Pretty People" – 5:39
 "Don't Get Sassy" – 1:05
 "Molasses" – 6:30
 Interview – 4:43
 "El Toro Grande" – 4:52
 Woody Speaks – 0:21
 "Lonesome Old Town" – 3:42
 Woody Speaks – 0:22
 "That's Where It Is" – 4:06
 "Cousins" – 4:18

Tracks 1-6: Thad Jones / Mel Lewis Jazz Orchestra 
Tracks 7-14: Woody Herman and his Swinging Herd

Personnel
Thad Jones / Mel Lewis Jazz Orchestra:
 Thad Jones – flugelhorn
 Jerome Richardson – alto saxophone
 Jerry Dodgion – alto saxophone
 Eddie Daniels – tenor saxophone
 Seldon Powell – tenor saxophone
 Pepper Adams – baritone saxophone
 Snooky Young – trumpet
 Richard Williams – trumpet
 Randy Brecker – trumpet
 Danny Moore – trumpet
 Bob Brookmeyer – trombone
 Garnett Brown – trombone
 Jimmy Knepper – trombone
 Benny Powell – trombone
 Roland Hanna – piano
 Richard Davis – bass
 Mel Lewis – drums
Woody Herman and his Swinging Herd:
 Woody Herman – clarinet, saxophone
 Bill Chase – trumpet
 Billy Hunt – trumpet
 Dave Dale – trumpet
 Phil Wilson – trombone
 Henry Southall – trombone
 Kenny Wenzel – trombone
 Sal Nistico – tenor sax
 Carmen Leggio – tenor sax
 Jackie Stevens – tenor sax
 Frank Hittner – baritone sax
 Nat Pierce – piano
 Chuck Andrus – bass
 Jake Hanna – drums

References
Jazz Casual.com
IDEM-1045, Jazz Casual: The Complete Woody Herman
IDEM 1048, Jazz Casual: Modern Jazz Quartet / Dave Brubeck / Thad Jones - Mel Lewis Orchestra

Concert films
The Thad Jones/Mel Lewis Orchestra albums
1968 albums
Woody Herman albums
Albums produced by Ralph J. Gleason
Music of the San Francisco Bay Area